Norma M. Field is an author and emeritus professor of East Asian studies at the University of Chicago.  She has taught Premodern Japanese Poetry and Prose, Premodern Japanese Language, and Gender Studies as relating to Japanese women.

Her areas of expertise include: Japan, Literature: Modern Japanese, Feminism, Translation, Humanities.

Field was born in Tokyo, Japan shortly after the end of World War II to an American serviceman father and his Japanese wife.  She was raised in Tokyo attending school in the Washington Heights District. At age 10, she transferred to the American School in Japan, where she stayed until she graduated from high school. After graduation, she moved to America, and received a BA from Pitzer College in European Studies.

Field has a master's degree from Indiana University and a Ph.D. from Princeton University. She was awarded a Guggenheim Fellowship in 1988.

Awards
 American Book Award

Selected publications
 The Splendor of Longing in the Tale of the Genji (1987)
 In the Realm of a Dying Emperor: A Portrait of Japan at Century's End (1993)
 From My Grandmother's Bedside: Sketches of Postwar Tokyo (1997)

References

External links
UChicago Experts Guide
American Schools in Japan

University of Chicago faculty
Indiana University alumni
Princeton University alumni
Living people
American School in Japan alumni
American Book Award winners
Year of birth missing (living people)
American women non-fiction writers
American women academics
21st-century American women